Clausiliidae, also known by their common name the door snails, are a taxonomic family of small, very elongate, mostly left-handed, air-breathing land snails, sinistral terrestrial pulmonate gastropod mollusks.

With about 1,300 species recent and fossil, this belong among the most diverse families of land gastropods (cf. Orthalicidae, although the marine gastropod family Pyramidellidae is larger).

Most species of Clausiliidae have an anatomical structure known as a clausilium, which enables the snail to close off the aperture of the shell with a sliding "door".

Shell description

Almost all the species of snails in the family of door snails are left-handed, which is an uncommon feature in gastropod shells in general.

These snails have shells which are extremely high-spired, with numerous whorls.

The shells tend to be club-shaped, tapering at both ends to a rounded nub. The aperture usually has visible folds.

The clausilium

Clausiliids are also very unusual among pulmonate gastropods in that most of them have a "door" or clausilium. The clausilium is not the same thing as an operculum, which does not exist at all in pulmonate gastropods.

The clausilium is a calcareous structure, tongue-shaped or spoon-shaped, which can close the aperture of the snail shell to protect the soft parts against predation by animals such as carnivorous beetle larvae. The narrow end of the clausilium slides in the grooves that are formed by the folds on the inside of the shell.

Anatomy 
In this family, the number of haploid chromosomes lies between 21 and 30 (according to the values in this table).

Taxonomy
The type genus is Clausilia Draparnaud, 1805.

The family Clausiliidae is classified within the informal group Sigmurethra, itself belonging to the clade Stylommatophora within the clade Eupulmonata (according to the taxonomy of the Gastropoda by Bouchet & Rocroi, 2005).

2005 taxonomy
The taxonomy of the Gastropoda by Bouchet & Rocroi, 2005 recognizes subfamilies as follows:

subfamily Clausiliinae Gray, 1855
 tribe Baleini (previously the subfamily Baleinae A. J. Wagner, 1913) - synonyms: Laciniariini H. Nordsieck, 1963; Tristaniinae Schileyko, 1999
 tribe Clausiliini Gray, 1855 - synonym: Fusulinae Lindholm, 1924
 tribe Gracillariini H. Nordsieck, 1979

subfamily Alopiinae A. J. Wagner, 1913
 tribe Alopiini A. J. Wagner, 1913
 tribe Cochlodinini Lindholm, 1925 (1923) - synonym: Marpessinae Wenz, 1923
 tribe Delimini Brandt, 1956 - synonym: Papilliferini Brandt, 1961 (n.a.)
 tribe Medorini H. Nordsieck, 1997
 tribe Montenegrinini H. Nordsieck, 1972

subfamily † Constrictinae H. Nordsieck, 1981

subfamily Garnieriinae C. Boettger, 1926
 tribe Garnieriini C. Boettger, 1926
 tribe Tropidaucheniini H. Nordsieck, 2002

subfamily † Eualopiinae H. Nordsieck, 1978
 tribe † Eualopiini H. Nordsieck, 1978
 tribe † Rillyini H. Nordsieck, 1985

subfamily Laminiferinae Wenz, 1923

subfamily Mentissoideinae Lindholm, 1924
 tribe Mentissoideini Lindholm, 1924 - synonym: Euxininae I. M. Likharev, 1962
 tribe Acrotomini H. Nordsieck, 1979
 tribe Boettgeriini H. Nordsieck, 1979
 tribe Euxinellini Neubert, 2002
 tribe Filosini H. Nordsieck, 1979
 tribe Olympicolini Neubert, 2002
 tribe Strigileuxinini H. Nordsieck, 1994
 tribe Strumosini H. Nordsieck, 1994

subfamily Neniinae Wenz, 1923 - Neniastrinae H. B. Baker, 1930

subfamily Phaedusinae A. J. Wagner, 1922
 † tribe Disjunctariini H. Nordsieck, 2014 
 tribe Megalophaedusini Zilch, 1954 - synonym: Zaptyxini Zilch, 1954
 † tribe Nordsieckiini H. Nordsieck, 2007 
 tribe Phaedusini A. J. Wagner, 1922
 † tribe Serrulellini H. Nordsieck, 2007 
 tribe Serrulinini Ehrmann, 1927
 tribe Synprosphymini H. Nordsieck, 2007

subfamily Serrulininae Ehrmann, 1927

Genera
Genera include:

Clausiliinae 
Tribe Acrotomini H. Nordsieck, 1979
 Acrotoma O. Boettger, 1881 - with four subgenera: Acrotoma, Acrotomina H. Nordsieck, 1977; Bzybia H. Nordsieck, 1977 and Castelliana Suvorov, 2002
 Akramowskia H. Nordsieck, 1975
 Armenica O. Boettger, 1877 - with two subgenera: Armenica and Astrogena Szekeres, 1970
 Inobseratella Lindholm, 1924
 Phrygica H. Nordsieck, 1994
 Roseniella Thiele, 1931 - with two subgenera: Chavchetia Neubert, 1992 and Roseniella
 Scrobifera O. Boettger, 1877
 Sprattia O. Boettger, 1883

tribe Baleini
 Alinda H. & A. Adams, 1855 - with two subgenera: Alinda and Pseudalinda O. Boettger, 1877
 Balea J. E. Gray, 1824
 Bulgarica O. Boettger, 1877 - with three subgenera Bulgarica, Pavlovicia H. Nordsieck, 1973 and Strigilecula Kennard & Woodward, 1923
 Lacinaria Hartmann, 1842
 Likharevia H. Nordsieck, 1975
 Mentissa H. & A.Adams, 1855
 Mentissella H. Nordsieck, 1973
 Micropontica O. Boettger, 1881 - with two subgenera: Baleopsina Lindholm, 1924 and Micropontica
 Mucronaria O. Boettger, 1877 - with two subgenera: Index O. Boettger, 1877 and Mucronaria
 Quadriplicata O. Boettger, 1878
 Strigillaria Vest, 1867
 Vestia Hesse, 1916 - with three subgenera: Brabenecia H. Nordsieck, 1974; Vestia and Vestiella H. Nordsieck, 1877

Tribe Boettgeriini H. Nordsieck, 1979
 Boettgeria O. Boettger, 1863 - with two subgenera: Boettgeriaand Loosjesiella Neubert & Groh, 1998
 Macroptychia O. Boettger, 1877
 Sabaeola Lindholm, 1925

tribe Clausiliini
 † Canalicia O. Boettger, 1863 
 Clausilia Draparnaud, 1805 - with two subgenera: Clausilia and Strobeliella H. Nordsieck, 1977
 Erjavecia Brusina, 1870
 Erjaveciella H. Nordsieck, 1977
 Fusulus Fitzinger, 1833 - with two subgenera: Erjaveciella H. Nordsieck, 1877 and Fusulus
 † Hollabrunnella H. Nordsieck, 2007 
 Julica H. Nordsieck, 1963
 Macrogastra Hartmann, 1841 - with three subgenera: Macrogastra, Pseudovestia H. Nordsieck, 1877 and Pyrostoma Vest, 1867
 Micridyla H. Nordsieck, 1973
 † Parafusulus H. Nordsieck, 2007 
 † Pliodiptychia H. Nordsieck, 1978 
 Pseudidyla O. Boettger, 1877
 Pseudofusulus H. Nordsieck, 1977 - has the only one species: Pseudofusulus varians
 Ruthenica Lindholm, 1924
 † Trolliella H. Nordsieck, 1981 

Tribe † Emarginariini H. Nordsieck, 2007 
 † Emarginaria O. Boettger, 1877 

Tribe Euxinellini Neubert, 2002
 Euxinella H. Nordsieck, 1973

Tribe Filosini H. Nordsieck, 1979
 Filosa O. Boettger, 1877
 Idyla H. & A. Adams, 1855 - with two subgenera: Idyla and Strigilidyla H. Nordsieck, 1994

tribe Gracillariini H. Nordsieck, 1979
 Graciliaria Bielz, 1867
  † Truciella H. Nordsieck, 1978

Tribe Mentissoideini Lindholm, 1924
 Elia H. & A.Adams, 1855 - with four subgenera: Acroeuxina O. Boettger, 1877; Caucasica O. Boettger, 1877; Elia and Megaleuxina O. Boettger, 1877
 Euxina O. Boettger, 1877 - with two subgenera: Euxina and Illunellaria Lindholm, 1924
 Euxinastra O. Boettger, 1888 - with two subgenera: Euxinastra and Odonteuxina H. Nordsieck, 1875
 Galeata O. Boettger, 1877
 Mentissoidea O. Boettger, 1877

Tribe Olympicolini Neubert, 2002
 Olympicola Hesse, 1916
 † Scrobiferoides Neubert, 1996 

Tribe Strigileuxinini H. Nordsieck, 1994
 Bitorquata O. Boettger, 1877
 Blaeneuxina Páll-Gergely & Szekeres, 2020
 Strigileuxina H. Nordsieck, 1975
 Sumelia H. Nordsieck, 1994

Tribe Strumosini H. Nordsieck, 1994
 Strumosa O. Boettger, 1877

Alopiinae A. J. Wagner, 1913 
Alopiinae
 † Dextrospira Hrubesch, 1965 

tribe Alopiini
 Alopia H. & A.Adams, 1855 - with two subgenera Alopia and Kimakowiczia Szekeres, 1969
 Herilla H. & A. Adams, 1855
 Montenegrina O. Boettger, 1877
 Protoherilla A. J. Wagner, 1921
 † Protriloba H. Nordsieck, 2014 
 Triloba Vest, 1867

tribe Cochlodinini Lindholm, 1925 (1923)
 Cochlodina A. Férussac, 1821 - with four subgenera: Cochlodina; Cochlodinastra H. Nordsieck, 1977; Paracochlodina H. Nordsieck, 1969; Procochlodina H. Nordsieck, 1969
 Macedonica O. Boettger, 1877

tribe Delimini R. Brandt, 1956
 Barcania Brandt, 1956
 Charpentieria Stabille, 1864 - with subgenera: Charpentieria
 Delima Hartmann, 1842 - with four subgenera: Delima; Dugiana Stamol & Slapnik, 2002; Piceata O. Boettger, 1877 and Semirugata O. Boettger, 1877
 Dilataria Vest, 1867
 Gibbularia Cecconi, 1908
 Mauritanica O. Boettger, 1879
 Papillifera Hartmann, 1842
 Sicania Tomlin, 1929
 Stigmatica O. Boettger, 1877

tribe Medorini H. Nordsieck, 1997
 Agathylla H. & A.Adams, 1855 - with two subgenera Agathylla and Agathyllina H. Nordsieck, 1969
 Albinaria Vest, 1867 - also includes former genusSericata O. Boettger, 1878.
 Carinigera Möllendorff, 1873
 Cristataria Vest, 1867
 Inchoatia Gittenberger & Uit de Weerd, 2006
 Isabellaria Vest, 1867
 Lampedusa O. Boettger, 1877 - with two subgenera Imitatrix Westerlund, 1884 and Lampedusa
 Leucostigma A. J. Wagner, 1919
 Medora H. & A. Adams, 1855
 Muticaria Lindholm, 1925
 Strigilodelima A. J. Wagner, 1924
 Vallatia E. Gittenberger & Uit de Weerd, 2006

Constrictinae 
Fossil subfamily Constrictinae contains genera:
 † Constricta O. Boettger, 1877 - type genus of the subfamily
 † Regiclausilia H. Nordsieck, 1981

Eualopiinae 
Fossil subfamily Eualopiinae contains genera:
 † Ambiguella H. Nordsieck, 2007 
 Formosana O. Boettger, 1877

Tribe † Eualopiini H. Nordsieck, 1978 
 † Eualopia O. Boettger, 1877 - type genus of the subfamily
 † Monoptychia H. Nordsieck, 1972 

Tribe † Rillyini † H. Nordsieck, 1985 
 † Neniopsilla H. Nordsieck, 2020 
 † Neniopsis Wenz, 1920 
 † Omanillya H. Nordsieck in Harzhauser et al., 2016 
 † Pararillya H. Nordsieck, 2002 
 † Proalbinaria O. Boettger in Oppenheim, 189
 † Rillya Munier-Chalmas [in P. Fischer], 1883 - type genus of the tribe
 † Neniopsilla H. Nordsieck, 2020 
 † Neniopsis Wenz, 1920 
 † Omanillya H. Nordsieck in Harzhauser et al., 2016 
 † Pararillya H. Nordsieck, 2002 
 † Proalbinaria O. Boettger in Oppenheim, 1895

Garnieriinae 
 tribe Garnieriini C. Boettger, 1926
 Garnieria Bourguignat, 1877

 tribe Tropidaucheniini H. Nordsieck, 2002
 Euryauchenia H. Nordsieck, 2007
 Grandinenia Minato & Chen, 1984
 Indonenia Ehrmann, 1927
 Megalauchenia H. Nordsieck, 2007
 Tropidauchenia Lindholm, 1924 -

Laminiferinae 
 Bofilliella Ehrmann, 1927
 Neniatlanta Bouguignat, 1876
 Margaritiphaedusa H. Nordsieck, 2001
 Minatoia Hunyadi & Szekeres, 2016

Tribe Laminiferini Wenz, 1923
 † Baboria Cossmann, 1898 
 † Laminifera O. Boettger, 1863 - the type genus of the family Laminiferinae. Its type species is fossil. 
 † Laminiplica H. Nordsieck, 1978 
 † Omanifera H. Nordsieck in Harzhauser et al., 2016 

Tribe † Oospiroidesini H. Nordsieck, 2007 
 † Oospiroides Wenz, 1920 

Tribe † Polloneriini H. Nordsieck, 2007 
 † Polloneria Sacco, 1886

Mentissoideinae 
synonym of the tribe Mentissoideini Lindholm, 1924 (superseded classification)

Neniinae  Wenz, 1923
Tribe Neniini Wenz, 1923
 Gonionenia Pilsbry, 1926
 Nenia H. & A. Adams, 1855
 Neniops Pilsbry, 1926
 Paranenia Rehder, 1939

Peruiniinae H. Nordsieck, 2005
 Andinia Polinski, 1922
 Audiniastra H. Nordsieck, 2005
 Andiniella Weyrauch, 1958
 Bequaertinenia Weyrauch, 1964 - with two subgenera: Bequaertinenia and Miranenia Grego & Szekeres, 2004
 Brevinenia Neubert & H. Nordsieck, 2005
 Columbinia Polinski, 1924 - with  subgenera: Columbinia and Steatonenia Pilsbry, 1926
 Cyclonenia H. Nordsieck, 1999
 Cylindronenia Ehrmann in Pilsbry, 1949 - with two subgenera: Cylindronenia and Cylindroneniella H. Nordsieck, 2007
 Ehrmanniella Zilch, 1949
 Gracilinenia Polinski, 1922
 Hemicena Pilsbry, 1949
 Incaglaia Pilsbry, 1949 - with two subgenera: Gibbonenia Zilch, 1954 and Incaglaia
 Incania Polinski, 1922
 Leuconenia H. Nordsieck, 2005
 Neniaptyx H. Nordsieck, 2007
 Neniatracta Pilsbry, 1926
 Neniella Grego & Sekeres, 2004
 Parabalea Ancey, 1882
 Peruinia Polinski, 1922
 Pfeifferiella Weyrauch, 1957
 Pseudogracilinenia Loosjes & Loosjes-van Bemmel, 1984
 Steeriana Jousseaume, 1900
 Symptychiella H. Nordsieck, 1999 - with two subgenera: Divnenia H. Nordsieck, 2005 and Symptychiella
 Temesa H. & A. Adams, 1855
 Zilchiella Weyrauch, 1957

Phaedusinae A. J. Wagner, 1922
 Selenophaedusa Lindholm, 1924
 Siciliaria Vest, 1867

Tribe † Disjunctariini H. Nordsieck, 2014 
 † Disjunctaria O. Boettger, 1877 

Tribe † Nordsieckiini H. Nordsieck, 2007 
 † Nordsieckia Truc, 1972 
 † Serruluna H. Nordsieck, 1981 

tribe Phaedusini A. J. Wagner, 1922
 Acanthophaedusa H. Nordsieck, 2007
 Atractophaedusa Ehrmann, 1927
 Bacillophaedusa Grego & Szekeres, 2011
 Bathyptychia Lindholm, 1925 - with three subgenera: Bathyptychia; Brachyptychia H. Nordsieck, 2001 and Strictiphaedusa H. Nordsieck, 2001
 Castanophaedusa Páll-Gergely & Szekeres, 2017
 Celsiphaedusa H. Nordsieck, 2001
 Changphaedusa Motochin & Ueshima, 2017
 Cylindrophaedusa O. Boettger, 1877 - with three subgenera: Cylindrophaedusa and Montiphaedusa H. Nordsieck, 2002
 Dautzenbergiella Lindholm, 1924 - with two subgenera: Dautzenbergiella and Mansuyiella H. Nordsieck, 2003
 Euphaedusa O. Boettger, 1877 - with  subgenera: Dentiphaedusa H. Nordsieck, 2003; Euphaedusa;  and Telophaedusa H. Nordsieck, 2003
 Fuchsiana Gredler, 1887
 Hemiphaedusa O. Boettger, 1877 - with  subgenera: Dendrophaedusa H. Nordsieck, 2002; Hemiphaedusa; Hemiphaedusoides H. Nordsieck, 2001; Hemizaptyx Pilsbry, 1905; Labyrinthiphaedusa H. Nordsieck, 2001; ; Pinguiphaedusa Azuma, 1982; Placeophaedusa Minato, 1994)
 Juttingia Loosjes, 1965 - with two subgenera: Juttingia and Pseudohemiphaedusa H. Nordsieck, 2002
 Liparophaedusa Lindholm, 1924
 Loosjesia H. Nordsieck, 2002
 Luchuphaedusa Pilsbry, 1901 - with two subgenera: Luchuphaedusa and Nesiophaedusa Pilsbry, 1905
 Macrophaedusa Moellendorff, 1883
 Macrophaedusella H. Nordsieck, 2001
 Megalophaedusa O. Boettger, 1877 - with four subgenera: Megalophaedusa; Mesophaedusa Ehrmann, 1929; Mesozaptyx Kuroda, 1963 and Mundiphaedusa Minato, 1979. (Neophaedusa is a synonym of Megalophaedusa).
 Messageriella Páll-Gergely & Szekeres, 2017
 Miraphaedusa H. Nordsieck, 2005
 Musaphaedusa H. Nordsieck, 2018
 Nannophaedusa H. Nordsieck, 2012
 Notoptychia Ehrmann, 1927
 Oospira Blanford, 1872 - with  subgenera  Formosanella H. Nordsieck, 2003; Oospira; Paraformosella H. Nordsieck, 2003 and Siphonophaedusa Lindholm, 1924
 Papilliphaedusa H. Nordsieck, 2003
 Paraphaedusa O. Boettger, 1877
 Phaedusa H. & A.Adams, 1855 - with  subgenera: Metaphaedusa H. Nordsieck, 2001; Phaedusa; Pseudophaedusa Tomiyama, 1984 
 Probosciphaedusa Z.-Y. Chen, 2021
 Reinia Kobelt, 1876 - with three subgenera: Parareinia H. Nordsieck, 1998; Pictophaedusa Azuma, 1982 and Reinia
 Serriphaedusa H. Nordsieck, 2001
 Sinigena Lindholm, 1925
 Solitariphaedusa Motochin & Ueshima, 2017
 Stereophaedusa O. Boettger, 1877
 Streptodera Lindholm, 1925
 Tauphaedusa H. Nordsieck, 2003
 Tosaphaedusa Ehrmann, 1929
 Zaptyx Pilsbry, 1901 - with two subgenera: Prozaptyx Loosjes, 1950 and Zaptyx

Tribe † Serrulellini H. Nordsieck, 2007 
 † Serrulastra H. Nordsieck, 1981 
 † Serrulella H. Nordsieck, 1978 

Tribe Serrulinini Ehrmann, 1927
 Caspiophaedusa Lindholm, 1924
 Cotyorica Grego & Szekeres, 2017
 Dobatia H. Nordsieck, 1973
 † Euxinophaedusa Likharev, 1962 
 Graecophaedusa Rähle, 1982
 Laeviphaedusa Likharev & Stelkov, 1965
 Microphaedusa H. Nordsieck, 1978
 Nothoserrulina Németh & Szekeres, 1995
 Pamphylica Németh & Szekeres, 1995
 Pontophaedusa Lindholm, 1924
 Pontophaedusella H. Nordsieck, 1994
 Pravispira Lindholm, 1924
 Sciocochlea C. Boettger, 1935
 Serrulina Mousson, 1873
 Truncatophaedusa Majoros, Németh & Szili-Kovács 1994
 Tsoukatosia Gittenberger, 2000 - with two subgenera: Agiosspeleikos A. & P. Reischütz, 2003 and Tsoukatosia

Tribe Synprosphymini H. Nordsieck, 2007
 Excussispira Lindholm, 1925
 Synprosphyma A. J. Wagner, 1920

Synonyms
 Diceratoptyx Pilsbry, 1905: synonym of Zaptyx Pilsbry, 1900 (junior synonym)
 Heterozaptyx Pilsbry, 1906: synonym of Zaptyx Pilsbry, 1900 (junior synonym)
 Kazancia Neubert, 1992 : synonym of  Lindholm, 1924 (junior synonym)
 Leptacme Ehrmann, 1927: synonym of Oospira (Leptocochlea) Grego & Szekeres, 2011 represented as Oospira W. T. Blanford, 1872
 Lindholmiella Ehrmann, 1927: synonym of Oospira (Lindholmiella) Ehrmann, 1927 represented as Oospira W. T. Blanford, 1872
 Metazaptyx Pilsbry, 1905synonym of Zaptyx Pilsbry, 1900
 Neniauchenia H. Nordsieck, 2002: synonym of Grandinenia Minato & D.-N. Chen, 1984
 Neostyriaca A. J. Wagner, 1920: synonym of Clausilia (Neostyriaca) A. J. Wagner, 1920 represented as Clausilia Draparnaud, 1805
 Oligozaptx Pilsbry, 1905: synonym of Zaptyx (Stereozaptyx) Pilsbry, 1905 represented as Zaptyx Pilsbry, 1900
 Parazaptyx Pilsbry, 1905: synonym of Zaptyx (Parazaptyx) Pilsbry, 1905 represented as Zaptyx Pilsbry, 1900
 Pliciphaedusa H. Nordsieck, 1998: synonym of Stereophaedusa (Pliciphaedusa) H. Nordsieck, 1998 represented as Stereophaedusa O. Boettger, 1877
 Pulchraptyx Minato, 1981: synonym of Zaptyx (Pulchraptyx) Minato, 1981 represented as Zaptyx Pilsbry, 1900
 Renschiphaedusa Loosjes & Loosjes-van Bemmel, 1973: synonym of Phaedusa H. Adams & A. Adams, 1855 
 Selenoptyx Pilsbry, 1908: synonym of Zaptyx (Selenoptyx) Pilsbry, 1908 represented as Zaptyx Pilsbry, 1900
 Serrulinella H. Nordsieck, 1984: synonym of Serrulina (Serrulinella) H. Nordsieck, 1984 represented as Serrulina Mousson, 1873 (unaccepted rank)
 Stereozaptyx Pilsbry, 1905: synonym of Zaptyx (Stereozaptyx) Pilsbry, 1905 represented as Zaptyx Pilsbry, 1900
 Thaumatoptyx Pilsbry, 1908: synonym of Zaptyx (Thaumatoptyx) Pilsbry, 1908 represented as Zaptyx Pilsbry, 1900
 Tyrannophaedusa Pilsbry, 1901: synonym of Megalophaedusa (Tyrannophaedusa) Pilsbry, 1900 represented as Megalophaedusa O. Boettger, 1877
 Tyrannozaptyx Käufel, 1930: synonym of Zaptyx (Tyrannozaptyx) Käufel, 1930 represented as Zaptyx Pilsbry, 1900
 Zaptychopsis Ehrmann, 1927: synonym of Zaptyx (Zaptychopsis) Ehrmann, 1927 represented as Zaptyx Pilsbry, 1900

Conservation 
Although non-marine molluscs appear to be exceptionally vulnerable to extinction, the IUCN Red list listed only 9 species from this family.

References

Further reading
 Maltz T. K. & Sulikowska-Drozd A. (2008) "Life Cycles of Clausiliids of Poland — Knowns and Unknowns". Annales Zoologici 58(4): 857-880. .
 Nordsieck H. (2007). Worldwide Door Snails. ConchBooks, 213 pp. .
 Uit de Weerd D. R. (2004). "Molecular phylogenetic history of eastern Mediterranean Alopiinae, a group of morphologically indeterminate land snails". Doctoral thesis, Department of Biology, Faculty of Science, Leiden University. HTM, PDF.
 Uit de Weerd D. R., Piel W. H. & Gittenberger E. (2004). "Widespread polyphyly among Alopiinae snail genera: when phylogeny mirrors biogeography more closely than morphology". Molecular Phylogenetics and Evolution 33(3): 533-548. 
New and little-known Clausiliidae (Gastropoda: Pulmonata) from Laos and southern Vietnam. Journal of Conchology 42(6): 507-519

External links

 Nordsieck H. (2005–2007). www.clausilia.de at Internet Archive.
 Nordsieck H.: http://www.hnords.de: Internet journal for the malacology of landsnails (with special regard to Clausiliidae).
 BioLib info

 
Taxa named by John Edward Gray